Büyük Ev Ablukada (Big House under Blockade) is a Turkish music group founded in Istanbul in 2008. The band was started by Cem Yılmazer (a.k.a. Afordisman Salihins) and Bartu Küçükçağlayan (a.k.a. Canavar Banavar.) After some time the band turned into an electrical version, which is described by "Full Faça". Büyük Ev Ablukada became well-known in a very short time with the help of their own songs and special concerts. The group members use aliases instead of their own names and some of the original names of the members are still unknown. They first released a concert record named "Ay Şuram Ağrıyo" and an album named "Olmadı Kaçarız", and then on 21 December 2012, they released their debut album "Full Faça," which was issued in both CD and vinyl by their own record company, Olmadı Kaçarız.

Full Faça 
 Havadar 4:16
 Nasıl İstediysen Öyle İşte 3:52
 Takıl Yani Takmıyo Belli 1:47
 Çıldırmicam 1:57
 Olanla Olunmaz 3:44
 İkimizin Oralar 3:56
 Ne Var Ne Yok 5:04
 Bi Hıçkırık Gibi 2:58
 En Güzel Yerinde Evin 4:01
 Bil 3:51
 Tayyar Ahmet'in Sonsuz Sayılı Günleri 6:17

Group Members
 Afordisman Salihins (Cem Yılmazer): Electric Guitar, Keyboards, Acoustic Guitar
 Bas Bariton: Bass guitar
 Bentek Sizhepiniz: Electric guitar
 Omçelik (Onur Ünsal) : Keyboards, Vocals
 Canavar Banavar (Bartu Küçükçağlayan): Vocals, Electric guitar, Acoustic guitar
 Galvaniz Gelbiraz: Vocals
 Gelicem Nerdesin (Alican Tezer): Drums
Production: Olmadı Kaçarız Plakçılık

References

External links
 Büyük Ev Ablukada web site
 Discography from Discogs

Musical groups from Istanbul
Turkish indie rock groups
Musical groups established in 2008